The cue sports competition at the 2001 World Games, including three-cushion billiards, nine-ball (a pool discipline) and snooker, took place from 22 to 26 August at the Selion Plaza in Akita, Japan. 62 competitors, from 24 nations, participated in the tournament.

Participating nations

Medal table

Events

References

 
2001 World Games
2001
World Games
Cue sports in Japan